Truszki-Patory  is a village in the administrative district of Gmina Kolno, within Kolno County, Podlaskie Voivodeship, in north-eastern Poland.

References

Truszki-Patory